Louise Crombach (or Crombak), was born on  in Lons-Le-Saunier and died on  in the 20th arrondissement of Paris, was a French seamstress and prison inspector, writer and feminist.

Biography 

Louise Crombach was the daughter of a peasant woman from Franche-Comté and an Alsatian Jew and she received a modest education. She began her professional life as a seamstress but, in view of her talent, compared to that of Elisa Mercœur, she was sent to Paris, where she was welcomed by Amable Tastu. She was introduced to the prestigious literary salon, the "Cenacle" held by Charles Nodier and was the protégé of  the Lamartines. She became the tutor of George Sand's daughter. Louise Crombach frequented literary circles where she met Marceline Desbordes-Valmore, also from a working class family. She was one of the first writers from a working-class background to be able to make a living from her art, continuing the trend started by George Sand.

Her first children's book, Le Jeune libéré, was published in 1839 and received the Montyon Prize from the French Academy the following year. In 1839, she gave birth to a child that was not recognized by her father and causing her to lose part of her protections because of the social scandal.

Faced with material difficulties, Elisa de Lamartine found her a job as a prison guard at the women's prison Saint-Lazare in 1842. Louise Crombach became an inspector there in 1844. It was there that she was moved by the detention conditions of the women prisoners and their misery to which she felt close.

In 1843, Flora Tristan, in spite of Louise Crombach's difficult financial situation, solicited her for a subscription that she organized for the newspaper L'Union ouvrière. That year, one of Desbordes-Valmore's poems ("Moi, je le sais", in Bouquets et prières) was dedicated to her. Louise Crombach introduced her to Marie Pape-Carpantier, as they knew each other. At the beginning of 1844, she joined the team of journalists of Le Nouveau Monde, Journal de la science sociale, which aimed to revive, without success, the former Fourierist journal Le Nouveau Monde.

Accused of having let a captive escape on February 6, 1845, a trial followed on May 30, 1845, during which letters insinuating a homosexual relationship with another prisoner were read. Desbordes-Valmore intervenes in this trial, exclaiming :

Louise Crombach was sentenced to two years in prison in June, but an appeal to the Court of Cassation overturned the judgment. She was released on November 28, 1845. The revelation of this correspondence, however, distanced her from Desbordes-Valmore, so much so that she did not intervene when Crombach was again the subject of a trial in November 1845 in Versailles. Crombach was nevertheless acquitted and went to take refuge in La Villette with a priest. She died in 1894.

Works 

 Le Jeune libéré (1839)
Hélène et Laurence (1841)
Un pauvre devant Dieu, ou Qu'est-ce que la richesse ?  (1845)
Les Papillons et les enfants, Alexandre et Michel, les Roses de la Fête-Dieu, le Médaillon-protecteur (1845)

References 

1815 births
French women poets
19th-century women writers
French fashion designers
French women fashion designers
Lesbophobia
1894 deaths